Humanities are academic disciplines that study aspects of human society and culture. In the Renaissance, the term contrasted with divinity and referred to what is now called classics, the main area of secular study in universities at the time. Today, the humanities are more frequently defined as any fields of study outside of natural sciences, social sciences, formal sciences (like mathematics) and applied sciences (or professional training). They use methods that are primarily critical, or speculative, and have a significant historical element—as distinguished from the mainly empirical approaches of the natural sciences; yet, unlike the sciences, there is no general history of humanities as a distinct discipline in its own right.

The humanities include the studies of foreign languages, history, philosophy, language arts (literature, writing, oratory, rhetoric, poetry, etc.), performing arts (theater, music, dance, etc.), and visual arts (painting, sculpture, photography, filmmaking, etc.); culinary art or cookery is interdisciplinary and may be considered both a humanity and a science. Some definitions of the humanities include law and religion, but these are not universally accepted. Although anthropology, archaeology, geography, linguistics, logic, and sociology share some similarities with the humanities, these are widely considered sciences; similarly economics, finance, and political science are not typically considered humanities.

Scholars in the humanities are called humanities scholars or sometimes humanists. (The term humanist also describes the philosophical position of humanism, which antihumanist scholars in the humanities reject. Renaissance scholars and artists are also known as humanists.) Some secondary schools offer humanities classes usually consisting of literature, global studies, and art.

Human disciplines like history and language mainly use the comparative method and comparative research. Other methods used in the humanities include hermeneutics, source criticism, esthetic interpretation, and speculative reason.

Fields

Classics

Classics, in the Western academic tradition, refers to the studies of the cultures of classical antiquity, namely Ancient Greek and Latin and the Ancient Greek and Roman cultures. Classical studies is considered one of the cornerstones of the humanities; however, its popularity declined during the 20th century. Nevertheless, the influence of classical ideas on many humanities disciplines, such as philosophy and literature, remains strong.

History

History is systematically collected information about the past. When used as the name of a field of study, history refers to the study and interpretation of the record of humans, societies, institutions, and any topic that has changed over time.

Traditionally, the study of history has been considered a part of the humanities. In modern academia, history can occasionally be classified as a social science, though this definition is contested.

Language

While the scientific study of language is known as linguistics and is generally considered a social science, a natural science or a cognitive science, the study of languages is still central to the humanities. A good deal of twentieth- and twenty-first-century philosophy has been devoted to the analysis of language and to the question of whether, as Wittgenstein claimed, many of our philosophical confusions derive from the vocabulary we use; literary theory has explored the rhetorical, associative, and ordering features of language; and historical linguists have studied the development of languages across time. Literature, covering a variety of uses of language including prose forms (such as the novel), poetry and drama, also lies at the heart of the modern humanities curriculum. College-level programs in a foreign language usually include study of important works of the literature in that language, as well as the language itself.

Law

 In common parlance, law means a rule that (unlike a rule of ethics) is enforceable through institutions. The study of law crosses the boundaries between the social sciences and humanities, depending on one's view of research into its objectives and effects. Law is not always enforceable, especially in the international relations context. It has been defined as a "system of rules", as an "interpretive concept" to achieve justice, as an "authority" to mediate people's interests, and even as "the command of a sovereign, backed by the threat of a sanction". However one likes to think of law, it is a completely central social institution. Legal policy incorporates the practical manifestation of thinking from almost every social science and discipline of the humanities. Laws are politics, because politicians create them. Law is philosophy, because moral and ethical persuasions shape their ideas. Law tells many of history's stories, because statutes, case law and codifications build up over time. And law is economics, because any rule about contract, tort, property law, labour law, company law and many more can have long-lasting effects on how productivity is organised and the distribution of wealth. The noun law derives from the late Old English lagu, meaning something laid down or fixed, and the adjective legal comes from the Latin word LEX.

Literature

 Literature is a term that does not have a universally accepted definition, but which has variably included all written work; writing that possesses literary merit; and language that foregrounds literariness, as opposed to ordinary language. Etymologically the term derives from Latin literatura/litteratura "writing formed with letters", although some definitions include spoken or sung texts. Literature can be classified according to whether it is fiction or non-fiction, and whether it is poetry or prose; it can be further distinguished according to major forms such as the novel, short story or drama; and works are often categorised according to historical periods, or according to their adherence to certain aesthetic features or expectations (genre).

Philosophy

Philosophy—etymologically, the "love of wisdom"—is generally the study of problems concerning matters such as existence, knowledge, justification, truth, justice, right and wrong, beauty, validity, mind, and language. Philosophy is distinguished from other ways of addressing these issues by its critical, generally systematic approach and its reliance on reasoned argument, rather than experiments (experimental philosophy being an exception).

Philosophy used to be a very comprehensive term, including what have subsequently become separate disciplines, such as physics. (As Immanuel Kant noted, "Ancient Greek philosophy was divided into three sciences: physics, ethics, and logic.") Today, the main fields of philosophy are logic, ethics, metaphysics, and epistemology. Still, it continues to overlap with other disciplines. The field of semantics, for example, brings philosophy into contact with linguistics.

Since the early twentieth century, philosophy in English-speaking universities has moved away from the humanities and closer to the formal sciences, becoming much more analytic. Analytic philosophy is marked by emphasis on the use of logic and formal methods of reasoning, conceptual analysis, and the use of symbolic and/or mathematical logic, as contrasted with the Continental style of philosophy. This method of inquiry is largely indebted to the work of philosophers such as Gottlob Frege, Bertrand Russell, G.E. Moore and Ludwig Wittgenstein.

Religion

 At present, we do not know of any people or tribe, either from history or the present day, which is (or was) altogether devoid of “religion.” Religion may be characterized with a community since humans are social animals. Rituals are used to bound the community together. Social animals require rules. Ethics is a requirement of society, but not a requirement of religion. Shinto, Daoism, and other folk or natural religions do not have ethical codes. The supernatural may or may not include deities since not all religions have deities. (Theravada Buddhism and Daoism). Magical thinking creates explanations not available for empirical verification. Stories or myths are narratives being both didactic and entertaining. They are necessary for understanding the human predicament. Some other possible characteristics of religion are pollutions and purification, the sacred and the profane, sacred texts, religious institutions and organizations, and sacrifice and prayer. Some of the major problems that religions confront, and attempts to answer are chaos, suffering, evil, and death.

The non-founder religions are Hinduism, Shinto, and native or folk religions.  Founder religions are Judaism, Christianity, Islam, Confucianism, Daoism, Mormonism, Jainism, Zoroastrianism, Buddhism, Sikhism, and the Baha’i faith. Religions must adapt and change through the generations because they must remain relevant to the adherents. When traditional religions fail to address new concerns, then new religions will emerge.

Performing arts

The performing arts differ from the visual arts in so far as the former uses the artist's own body, face, and presence as a medium, and the latter uses materials such as clay, metal, or paint, which can be molded or transformed to create some art object. Performing arts include acrobatics, busking, comedy, dance, film, magic, music, opera, juggling, marching arts, such as brass bands, and theatre.

Artists who participate in these arts in front of an audience are called performers, including actors, comedians, dancers, musicians, and singers. Performing arts are also supported by workers in related fields, such as songwriting and stagecraft. Performers often adapt their appearance, such as with costumes and stage makeup, etc. There is also a specialized form of fine art in which the artists perform their work live to an audience. This is called Performance art. Most performance art also involves some form of plastic art, perhaps in the creation of props. Dance was often referred to as a plastic art during the Modern dance era.

Musicology

Musicology as an academic discipline can take a number of different paths, including historical musicology, music literature, ethnomusicology and music theory. Undergraduate music majors generally take courses in all of these areas, while graduate students focus on a particular path. In the liberal arts tradition, musicology is also used to broaden skills of non-musicians by teaching skills such as concentration and listening.

Theatre
Theatre (or theater) (Greek "theatron", θέατρον) is the branch of the performing arts concerned with acting out stories in front of an audience using combinations of speech, gesture, music, dance, sound and spectacle — indeed any one or more elements of the other performing arts. In addition to the standard narrative dialogue style, theatre takes such forms as opera, ballet, mime, kabuki, classical Indian dance, Chinese opera, mummers' plays, and pantomime.

Dance
Dance (from Old French dancier, perhaps from Frankish) generally refers to human movement either used as a form of expression or presented in a social, spiritual or performance setting. Dance is also used to describe methods of non-verbal communication (see body language) between humans or animals (bee dance, mating dance), and motion in inanimate objects (the leaves danced in the wind). Choreography is the art of creating dances, and the person who does this is called a choreographer.

Definitions of what constitutes dance are dependent on social, cultural, aesthetic, artistic, and moral constraints and range from functional movement (such as Folk dance) to codified, virtuoso techniques such as ballet.

Visual arts

History of visual arts

The great traditions in art have a foundation in the art of one of the ancient civilizations, such as Ancient Japan, Greece and Rome, China, India, Greater Nepal, Mesopotamia and Mesoamerica.

Ancient Greek art saw a veneration of the human physical form and the development of equivalent skills to show musculature, poise, beauty and anatomically correct proportions. Ancient Roman art depicted gods as idealized humans, shown with characteristic distinguishing features (e.g., Zeus' thunderbolt).

In Byzantine and Gothic art of the Middle Ages, the dominance of the church insisted on the expression of biblical and not material truths. The Renaissance saw the return to valuation of the material world, and this shift is reflected in art forms, which show the corporeality of the human body, and the three-dimensional reality of landscape.

Eastern art has generally worked in a style akin to Western medieval art, namely a concentration on surface patterning and local colour (meaning the plain colour of an object, such as basic red for a red robe, rather than the modulations of that colour brought about by light, shade and reflection). A characteristic of this style is that the local colour is often defined by an outline (a contemporary equivalent is the cartoon). This is evident in, for example, the art of India, Tibet and Japan.

Religious Islamic art forbids iconography, and expresses religious ideas through geometry instead. The physical and rational certainties depicted by the 19th-century Enlightenment were shattered not only by new discoveries of relativity by Einstein and of unseen psychology by Freud, but also by unprecedented technological development. Increasing global interaction during this time saw an equivalent influence of other cultures into Western art.

Media types

Drawing
Drawing is a means of making a picture, using any of a wide variety of tools and techniques. It generally involves making marks on a surface by applying pressure from a tool, or moving a tool across a surface. Common tools are graphite pencils, pen and ink, inked brushes, wax color pencils, crayons, charcoals, pastels, and markers. Digital tools that simulate the effects of these are also used. The main techniques used in drawing are: line drawing, hatching, crosshatching, random hatching, scribbling, stippling, and blending. A computer aided designer who excels in technical drawing is referred to as a draftsman or draughtsman.

Painting

Painting taken literally is the practice of applying pigment suspended in a carrier (or medium) and a binding agent (a glue) to a surface (support) such as paper, canvas or a wall. However, when used in an artistic sense it means the use of this activity in combination with drawing, composition and other aesthetic considerations in order to manifest the expressive and conceptual intention of the practitioner. Painting is also used to express spiritual motifs and ideas; sites of this kind of painting range from artwork depicting mythological figures on pottery to The Sistine Chapel to the human body itself.

Colour is highly subjective, but has observable psychological effects, although these can differ from one culture to the next. Black is associated with mourning in the West, but elsewhere white may be. Some painters, theoreticians, writers and scientists, including Goethe, Kandinsky, Isaac Newton, have written their own colour theories. Moreover, the use of language is only a generalization for a colour equivalent. The word "red", for example, can cover a wide range of variations on the pure red of the spectrum. There is not a formalized register of different colours in the way that there is agreement on different notes in music, such as C or C# in music, although the Pantone system is widely used in the printing and design industry for this purpose.

Modern artists have extended the practice of painting considerably to include, for example, collage. This began with cubism and is not painting in strict sense. Some modern painters incorporate different materials such as sand, cement, straw or wood for their texture. Examples of this are the works of Jean Dubuffet or Anselm Kiefer. Modern and contemporary art has moved away from the historic value of craft in favour of concept (conceptual art); this has led some e.g. Joseph Kosuth to say that painting, as a serious art form, is dead, although this has not deterred the majority of artists from continuing to practise it either as whole or part of their work.

Sculpture involves creating three-dimensional forms out of various materials. These typically include moldable substances like clay and metal but may also extend to material that is cut or shaved down to the desired form, like stone and wood.

Origin of the term
The word "humanities" is derived from the Renaissance Latin expression studia humanitatis, or "study of humanitas" (a classical Latin word meaning—in addition to "humanity"—"culture, refinement, education" and, specifically, an "education befitting a cultivated man"). In its usage in the early 15th century, the studia humanitatis was a course of studies that consisted of grammar, poetry, rhetoric, history, and moral philosophy, primarily derived from the study of Latin and Greek classics. The word humanitas also gave rise to the Renaissance Italian neologism umanisti, whence "humanist", "Renaissance humanism".

History
In the West, the history of the humanities can be traced to ancient Greece, as the basis of a broad education for citizens. During Roman times, the concept of the seven liberal arts evolved, involving grammar, rhetoric and logic (the trivium), along with arithmetic, geometry, astronomy and music (the quadrivium). These subjects formed the bulk of medieval education, with the emphasis being on the humanities as skills or "ways of doing".

A major shift occurred with the Renaissance humanism of the fifteenth century, when the humanities began to be regarded as subjects to study rather than practice, with a corresponding shift away from traditional fields into areas such as literature and history. In the 20th century, this view was in turn challenged by the postmodernist movement, which sought to redefine the humanities in more egalitarian terms suitable for a democratic society since the Greek and Roman societies in which the humanities originated were not at all democratic.

Today

Education and employment 
For many decades, there has been a growing public perception that a humanities education inadequately prepares graduates for employment. The common belief is that graduates from such programs face underemployment and incomes too low for a humanities education to be worth the investment.

In fact, humanities graduates find employment in a wide variety of management and professional occupations. In Britain, for example, over 11,000 humanities majors found employment in the following occupations:
 Education (25.8%)
 Management (19.8%)
 Media/Literature/Arts (11.4%)
 Law (11.3%)
 Finance (10.4%)
 Civil service (5.8%)
 Not-for-profit (5.2%)
 Marketing (2.3%)
 Medicine (1.7%)
 Other (6.4%)
Many humanities graduates finish university with no career goals in mind. Consequently, many spend the first few years after graduation deciding what to do next, resulting in lower incomes at the start of their career; meanwhile, graduates from career-oriented programs experience more rapid entry into the labour market. However, usually within five years of graduation, humanities graduates find an occupation or career path that appeals to them.

There is empirical evidence that graduates from humanities programs earn less than graduates from other university programs. However, the empirical evidence also shows that humanities graduates still earn notably higher incomes than workers with no postsecondary education, and have job satisfaction levels comparable to their peers from other fields. Humanities graduates also earn more as their careers progress; ten years after graduation, the income difference between humanities graduates and graduates from other university programs is no longer statistically significant. Humanities graduates can boost their incomes if they obtain advanced or professional degrees.

In the United States

The Humanities Indicators
The Humanities Indicators, unveiled in 2009 by the American Academy of Arts and Sciences, are the first comprehensive compilation of data about the humanities in the United States, providing scholars, policymakers and the public with detailed information on humanities education from primary to higher education, the humanities workforce, humanities funding and research, and public humanities activities. Modeled after the National Science Board's Science and Engineering Indicators, the Humanities Indicators are a source of reliable benchmarks to guide analysis of the state of the humanities in the United States.

If "The STEM Crisis Is a Myth", statements about a "crisis" in the humanities are also misleading and ignore data of the sort collected by the Humanities Indicators.

The Humanities in American Life
The 1980 United States Rockefeller Commission on the Humanities described the humanities in its report, The Humanities in American Life:
Through the humanities we reflect on the fundamental question: What does it mean to be human? The humanities offer clues but never a complete answer. They reveal how people have tried to make moral, spiritual, and intellectual sense of a world where irrationality, despair, loneliness, and death are as conspicuous as birth, friendship, hope, and reason.

As a major

In 1950, a little over 1 percent of 22-year-olds in the United States had earned a humanities degrees (defined as a degree in English, language, history, philosophy); in 2010, this had doubled to about 2 and a half percent. In part, this is because there was an overall rise in the number of Americans who have any kind of college degree. (In 1940, 4.6 percent had a four-year degree; in 2016, 33.4 percent had one.) As a percentage of the type of degrees awarded, however, the humanities seem to be declining. Harvard University provides one example. In 1954, 36 percent of Harvard undergraduates majored in the humanities, but in 2012, only 20 percent took that course of study. Professor Benjamin Schmidt of Northeastern University has documented that between 1990 and 2008, degrees in English, history, foreign languages, and philosophy have decreased from 8 percent to just under 5 percent of all U.S. college degrees.

In liberal arts education
The Commission on the Humanities and Social Sciences 2013 report The Heart of the Matter supports the notion of a broad "liberal arts education", which includes study in disciplines from the natural sciences to the arts as well as the humanities.

Many colleges provide such an education; some require it. The University of Chicago and Columbia University were among the first schools to require an extensive core curriculum in philosophy, literature, and the arts for all students. Other colleges with nationally recognized, mandatory programs in the liberal arts are Fordham University, St. John's College, Saint Anselm College and Providence College. Prominent proponents of liberal arts in the United States have included Mortimer J. Adler and E. D. Hirsch, Jr.

In the digital age
Researchers in the humanities have developed numerous large- and small-scale digital corporations, such as digitized collections of historical texts, along with the digital tools and methods to analyze them. Their aim is both to uncover new knowledge about corpora and to visualize research data in new and revealing ways. Much of this activity occurs in a field called the digital humanities.

STEM
Politicians in the United States currently espouse a need for increased funding of the STEM fields, science, technology, engineering, mathematics. Federal funding represents a much smaller fraction of funding for humanities than other fields such as STEM or medicine. The result was a decline of quality in both college and pre-college education in the humanities field.

Three-term Louisiana Governor Edwin Edwards acknowledged the importance of the humanities in a 2014 video address to the academic conference, Revolutions in Eighteenth-Century Sociability. Edwards said:
Without the humanities to teach us how history has succeeded or failed in directing the fruits of technology and science to the betterment of our tribe of homo sapiens, without the humanities to teach us how to frame the discussion and to properly debate the uses-and the costs-of technology, without the humanities to teach us how to safely debate how to create a more just society with our fellow man and woman, technology and science would eventually default to the  ownership of—and misuse by—the most influential, the most powerful, the most feared among us.

In Europe

The value of the humanities debate

The contemporary debate in the field of critical university studies centers around the declining value of the humanities. As in America, there is a perceived decline in interest within higher education policy in research that is qualitative and does not produce marketable products. This threat can be seen in a variety of forms across Europe, but much critical attention has been given to the field of research assessment in particular. For example, the UK [Research Excellence Framework] has been subject to criticism due to its assessment criteria from across the humanities, and indeed, the social sciences. In particular, the notion of "impact" has generated significant debate.

Philosophical history

Citizenship and self-reflection

Since the late 19th century, a central justification for the humanities has been that it aids and encourages self-reflection—a self-reflection that, in turn, helps develop personal consciousness or an active sense of civic duty.

Wilhelm Dilthey and Hans-Georg Gadamer centered the humanities' attempt to distinguish itself from the natural sciences in humankind's urge to understand its own experiences. This understanding, they claimed, ties like-minded people from similar cultural backgrounds together and provides a sense of cultural continuity with the philosophical past.

Scholars in the late 20th and early 21st centuries extended that "narrative imagination" to the ability to understand the records of lived experiences outside of one's own individual social and cultural context. Through that narrative imagination, it is claimed, humanities scholars and students develop a conscience more suited to the multicultural world we live in. That conscience might take the form of a passive one that allows more effective self-reflection or extend into active empathy that facilitates the dispensation of civic duties a responsible world citizen must engage in. There is disagreement, however, on the level of influence humanities study can have on an individual and whether or not the understanding produced in humanistic enterprise can guarantee an "identifiable positive effect on people."

Humanistic theories and practices
There are three major branches of knowledge: natural sciences, social sciences, and the humanities. Technology is the practical extension  of the natural sciences, as politics is the extension of the social sciences. Similarly, the humanities have their own practical extension, sometimes called "transformative humanities" (transhumanities) or "culturonics" (Mikhail Epstein's term):
 Nature – natural sciences – technology –  transformation of nature
 
 Society – social sciences –  politics – transformation of society
 
 Culture – human sciences – culturonics – transformation of culture
Technology, politics and culturonics are designed to transform what their respective disciplines study: nature, society, and culture. The field of transformative humanities includes various   practicies and technologies, for example, language planning, the construction of new languages, like Esperanto, and invention of new artistic and literary genres and movements in the genre of manifesto, like Romanticism, Symbolism, or Surrealism.  Humanistic invention in the sphere of culture, as a practice complementary to scholarship, is an important aspect of the humanities.

Truth and meaning

The divide between humanistic study and natural sciences informs arguments of meaning in humanities as well. What distinguishes the humanities from the natural sciences is not a certain subject matter, but rather the mode of approach to any question. Humanities focuses on understanding meaning, purpose, and goals and furthers the appreciation of singular historical and social phenomena—an interpretive method of finding "truth"—rather than explaining the causality of events or uncovering the truth of the natural world. Apart from its societal application, narrative imagination is an important tool in the (re)production of understood meaning in history, culture and literature.

Imagination, as part of the tool kit of artists or scholars, helps create meaning that invokes a response from an audience. Since a humanities scholar is always within the nexus of lived experiences, no "absolute" knowledge is theoretically possible; knowledge is instead a ceaseless procedure of inventing and reinventing the context a text is read in. Poststructuralism has problematized an approach to the humanistic study based on questions of meaning, intentionality, and authorship. In the wake of the death of the author proclaimed by Roland Barthes, various theoretical currents such as deconstruction and discourse analysis seek to expose the ideologies and rhetoric operative in producing both the purportedly meaningful objects and the hermeneutic subjects of humanistic study. This exposure has opened up the interpretive structures of the humanities to criticism that humanities scholarship is "unscientific" and therefore unfit for inclusion in modern university curricula because of the very nature of its changing contextual meaning.

Pleasure, the pursuit of knowledge and scholarship

Some, like Stanley Fish, have claimed that the humanities can defend themselves best by refusing to make any claims of utility. (Fish may well be thinking primarily of literary study, rather than history and philosophy.) Any attempt to justify the humanities in terms of outside benefits such as social usefulness (say increased productivity) or in terms of ennobling effects on the individual (such as greater wisdom or diminished prejudice) is ungrounded, according to Fish, and simply places impossible demands on the relevant academic departments. Furthermore, critical thinking, while arguably a result of humanistic training, can be acquired in other contexts. And the humanities do not even provide any more the kind of social cachet (what sociologists sometimes call "cultural capital") that was helpful to succeed in Western society before the age of mass education following World War II.

Instead, scholars like Fish suggest that the humanities offer a unique kind of pleasure, a pleasure based on the common pursuit of knowledge (even if it is only disciplinary knowledge). Such pleasure contrasts with the increasing privatization of leisure and instant gratification characteristic of Western culture; it thus meets Jürgen Habermas' requirements for the disregard of social status and rational problematization of previously unquestioned areas necessary for an endeavor which takes place in the bourgeois public sphere. In this argument, then, only the academic pursuit of pleasure can provide a link between the private and the public realm in modern Western consumer society and strengthen that public sphere that, according to many theorists, is the foundation for modern democracy.

Others, like Mark Bauerlein, argue that professors in the humanities have increasingly abandoned proven methods of epistemology (I care only about the quality of your arguments, not your conclusions.) in favor of indoctrination (I care only about your conclusions, not the quality of your arguments.). The result is that professors and their students adhere rigidly to a limited set of viewpoints, and have little interest in, or understanding of, opposing viewpoints. Once they obtain this intellectual self-satisfaction, persistent lapses in learning, research, and evaluation are common.

Romanticization and rejection

Implicit in many of these arguments supporting the humanities are the makings of arguments against public support of the humanities. Joseph Carroll asserts that we live in a changing world, a world where "cultural capital" is replaced with scientific literacy, and in which the romantic notion of a Renaissance humanities scholar is obsolete. Such arguments appeal to judgments and anxieties about the essential uselessness of the humanities, especially in an age when it is seemingly vitally important for scholars of literature, history and the arts to engage in "collaborative work with experimental scientists or even simply to make "intelligent use of the findings from empirical science."

Despite many humanities based arguments against the humanities some within the exact sciences have called for their return. In 2017, Science popularizer Bill Nye retracted previous claims about the supposed 'uselessness' of philosophy. As Bill Nye states, “People allude to Socrates and Plato and Aristotle all the time, and I think many of us who make those references don’t have a solid grounding,” he said. “It’s good to know the history of philosophy.” Scholars, such as biologist Scott F. Gilbert, make the claim that it is in fact the increasing predominance, leading to exclusivity, of scientific ways of thinking that need to be tempered by historical and social context. Gilbert worries that the commercialization that may be inherent in some ways of conceiving science (pursuit of funding, academic prestige etc.) need to be examined externally. Gilbert argues "First of all, there is a very successful alternative to science as a commercialized march to “progress.” This is the approach taken by the liberal arts college, a model that takes pride in seeing science in context and in integrating science with the humanities and social sciences."

See also

 Discourse analysis
 Outline of the humanities (humanities topics)
 Great Books
 Great Books programs in Canada
 Liberal arts
 Social sciences
 Humanities, arts, and social sciences
 Human science
 The Two Cultures
 List of academic disciplines
 Public humanities
 STEAM fields
 Tinbergen's four questions
 Environmental humanities

References

External links 

Society for the History of the Humanities
Institute for Comparative Research in Human and Social Sciences (ICR) – Japan
The American Academy of Arts and Sciences – US
Humanities Indicators – US
National Humanities Center – US
The Humanities Association – UK
National Humanities Alliance
National Endowment for the Humanities – US
Australian Academy of the Humanities
National 
American Academy Commission on the Humanities and Social Sciences 
"Games and Historical Narratives" by Jeremy Antley – Journal of Digital Humanities
Film about the Value of the Humanities

 
Humans
Main topic articles
Society